is a city located in Kagoshima Prefecture, Japan. The city was founded on September 1, 1949.

As of April 2017, the city has an estimated population of 21,960 and a population density of 290 persons per km². The total area is 74.88 km².

It is famous for its katsuobushi processing plants, which produce the chief flavoring ingredient—dried fish flakes—found in Japanese miso soup. About 70 small family businesses year-round boil, cut, dry and smoke the pungent fish, often sending a unique odor of steam, smoke and fish scent across the downtown area and out to sea.

Makurazaki is the site of the terminus of the southernmost JR train line in Japan, the Ibusuki Makurazaki Line. The Japanese know the town as the Typhoon Ginza (after Ginza in Tokyo). Each summer many cyclones strike the main islands first in the area of Makurazaki.

Geography

Climate
Makurazaki has a humid subtropical climate (Köppen climate classification Cfa) with hot summers and mild winters. Precipitation is high throughout the year, and is especially high from May to July.

Demographics
Per Japanese census data, the population of Makurazaki in 2020 is 20,033 people. Makurazaki has been conducting a census since 1920, and the city's population peaked in the 1950s at more than 35,000 people; the population has declined slowly since then. The population of Makurazaki in 2020 is only 70% of the 1955 census.

References

External links

 Makurazaki City official website 
 Makurazaki Katsuobushi official website
 

Cities in Kagoshima Prefecture